Novi Sip is a village in the municipality of Kladovo, Serbia. According to the 2002 census, the village has a population of 909 people.

It is located near the former Sip Canal, on the right bank of the Danube.

References

Populated places in Bor District